Paraplatytes is a genus of moths of the family Crambidae. It contains only one species, Paraplatytes eberti, which is found in Afghanistan.

References

Natural History Museum Lepidoptera genus database

Crambinae
Crambidae genera
Monotypic moth genera
Taxa named by Stanisław Błeszyński